Prefabricated homes, often referred to as prefab homes or simply prefabs, are specialist dwelling types of prefabricated building, which are manufactured off-site in advance, usually in standard sections that can be easily shipped and assembled. Some current prefab home designs include architectural details inspired by postmodernism or futurist architecture.

"Prefabricated" may refer to buildings built in components (e.g. panels), modules (modular homes) or transportable sections (manufactured homes), and may also be used to refer to mobile homes, i.e., houses on wheels. Although similar, the methods and design of the three vary widely. There are two-level home plans, as well as custom home plans. There are considerable differences in the construction types. In the U.S., mobile and manufactured houses are constructed in accordance with HUD building codes, while modular houses are constructed in accordance with the IRC (International Residential Code).

Modular homes are created in sections, and then transported to the home site for construction and installation. Although the sections of the house are prefabricated, the sections, or modules, are put together at the construction much like a typical home. 
Manufactured homes are built onto steel beams, and are transported in complete sections to the home site, where they are assembled. Wheels, hitch and axles are removed on site when the home is placed on a permanent foundation.
Mobile homes, or trailers, are built on wheels, and can be pulled by a vehicle. They are considered to be personal property, and are licensed by the Dept. of Motor Vehicles. Tiny homes with wheels are included in this category. They must be built to the DMV code, and pass inspection for licensing.

Word origin
The word "prefab" is not an industry term like modular home, manufactured home, panelized home or site-built home.

History

The first mention of a prefabricated building was in 1160 to 1170 by Wace as confirmed by Pierre Bouet. In the special May/June 2015 edition of the French magazine Historia, he spoke of a castle transported by Normans in 'kit' form. According to Bouet, Wace's epic poem Roman de Rou, verses 6,516–6,526, states: "They took out of the ship beams of wood and dragged them to the ground. Then the Count (Earl) who brought them, (the beams) already pierced and planed, carved and trimmed, the pegs (raw-plugs/dowels) already trimmed and transported in barrels, erected a castle, had a moat dug around it and thus had constructed a big fortress during the night."

Movable structures were used in 16th century in India by Emperor Akbar The Great. These structures were reported by Arif Qandahari in 1579.

In the United States, several companies including Sears Catalog Homes began offering mail-order kit homes between 1902 and 1910. The Forest Products Laboratory, a division of the U.S. Forest Service, put extensive research into prefabricated homes in the 1930s, including building one for the 1935 Madison Home Show. This research continued into the 1960s.

By 1958, roughly 10 percent of new houses in the United states were prefabricated.

Contemporary domestic prefabrication 

Currently, the prefabricated housing industry is divided by methodology of construction. Panelized, Modular, and Manufactured home design make up the majority of contemporary firms, with considerable overlap between the construction methods.

Panelized homes 
Panelized homes (also referred to as system built homes), construct the structural components, or "panels", of a home (walls, roof and floor systems) in an off site factory where the panels are cut via automated saws and laser cutters from large wooden sheets, allowing for lower amount of waste compared to site-built construction. Following their cutting and shaping, panels are stacked and delivered to the jobsite where the home is assembled piecemeal in a similar method to traditional site-built home.

Panelized homes are generally considered a halfway between more traditional site-built home and more manufactured prefabs, with the flexibility of site-build and efficiency of prefab.

Modular Houses 
Modular houses are built using a system that involves a sequential process in which modern techniques such as 3D digital modeling are now being used, which allows for pre-planning to make the process more efficient.

This type of construction is typically up to 50% faster and requires up to 50% less materials than conventional or traditional construction. The size of the global modular construction market is expected to reach USD 271 billion by 2028.

North America

United States 
The total market share of non-site built single-family homes (modular and panelized) was at 3% of single-family completions in 2020, according to Census Bureau Survey of Construction data and NAHB analysis. This share is expected to rise moderately in 2021.

Europe 

In the United Kingdom, more than 156,000 prefabricated homes were built between 1945 and 1948.

In the 1940s French designer Jean Prouvé designed an aluminum prefabricated house, the Maison Tropicale, for use in Africa.

After the World War II until 1948, Sell-Fertighaus GmbH built over 5,000 prefabricated houses in Germany for the occupying force of the United States.

There is no pan-EU housing standard for this kind of home construction, and regulation is at the national level. EU directives that apply to housing construction and design do not directly affect the modular home sector. However, each modular home must comply with EU's Eurocodes and local building codes.

United Kingdom

In the United Kingdom, the word "prefab" is often associated with a specific type of prefabricated house built in large numbers after the Second World War, such as Airey houses, as a temporary replacement for housing that had been destroyed by bombs, particularly in London.

Despite the intention that these dwellings would be a strictly temporary measure, many remained inhabited for years and even decades after the end of the war. A small number are still in use in the 21st century, but more and more are being demolished. In 2011 it was announced that Britain’s largest remaining prefab estate of 187 homes in Lewisham, South-East London, is to be redeveloped except for six homes.

Prefabs were also built in the First World War such as the still occupied houses in Austin Village, Birmingham.

The latest iteration of the idea is a development of 36 apartments called y:cube made by the YMCA in Mitcham, South London Ilke Homes in Knaresborough constructs 2 and 3 bedroom 'modular' homes that can be erected in 36 hours.

Australia and Asia
In 2010, Bali exported 98,417 prefabricated houses, but in 2011 the region only exported 5,007 units due to the global economic slowdown that affected a number of export destinations. These Balinese prefab houses are well known for their artistic design and practical value.

See also
Excel Homes
Manufactured housing
Reefer container housing units
Modular building
Prefabrication
Rocio Romero

References

House styles
House types in the United Kingdom
Housing in the United States
House types
 
Articles containing video clips